Ronna-Rae Leonard is a Canadian politician, who was elected to the Legislative Assembly of British Columbia in the 2017 provincial election. She represents the electoral district of Courtenay-Comox as a member of the British Columbia New Democratic Party caucus.

Initially declared elected by a margin of just nine votes over British Columbia Liberal Party candidate Jim Benninger on election day, her victory was confirmed on May 24, 2017 after the count of absentee ballots widened her lead to 189 votes.

Prior to her election to the legislature, Leonard was a municipal councillor in Courtenay. She was the federal New Democratic Party's candidate in Vancouver Island North for the 2011 federal election, losing narrowly to John Duncan.

Electoral record

Provincial elections

Federal elections

References

British Columbia candidates for Member of Parliament
British Columbia municipal councillors
British Columbia New Democratic Party MLAs
Living people
New Democratic Party candidates for the Canadian House of Commons
People from Courtenay, British Columbia
Women MLAs in British Columbia
Women municipal councillors in Canada
21st-century Canadian politicians
21st-century Canadian women politicians
Year of birth missing (living people)